Ankhu Khola-1 Hydropower Station (Nepali: आखु खोला जलविद्युत आयोजना) is a run-of-river hydro-electric plant located in  Dhading District of Nepal. The flow from Ankhu River, a tributary of Trishuli River, is used to generate 8.4 MW electricity. The plant is owned and developed by Ankhu Jalvidut Co. Pvt. Ltd , an IPP of Nepal. The plant started generating electricity from 2070-05-08 BS. The generation licence will expire in 2101-08-25 BS, after which the plant will be handed over to the government. The power station is connected to the national grid and the electricity is sold to Nepal Electricity Authority.

See also

List of power stations in Nepal

References

Hydroelectric power stations in Nepal
Gravity dams
Run-of-the-river power stations
Dams in Nepal
Irrigation in Nepal
2013 establishments in Nepal
Buildings and structures in Dhading District